Ziaur Rahman Ansari (9 March 1925–6 October 1992) was  an Indian politician.  He was elected to the Lok Sabha, the lower house of the Parliament of India from the Unnao constituency of Uttar Pradesh as a member of the Indian National Congress.

References

External links
Official Biographical Sketch in Lok Sabha Website

Indian National Congress politicians
1925 births
1992 deaths
Members of the Cabinet of India
Petroleum and Natural Gas Ministers of India
Indian National Congress politicians from Uttar Pradesh